The 2012–13 season was Associazione Sportiva Roma's 85th in existence and 84th season in the top flight of Italian football. The pre-season started with the June hiring of former manager Zdeněk Zeman. Zeman replaced Luis Enrique who resigned at the end of the 2011–12 season. Enrique's lone season reign saw the disappointing loss to Slovan Bratislava in the Europa League as well as the inability to qualify for international competitions for the 2012–13 season. Roma eventually finished 7th, losing the Europa League chase to rivals Lazio, Napoli and Internazionale.

Zeman brought back his high-scoring 4–3–3 formation and his hard working ethic which successfully guided former team Pescara to the Serie A. He was, however, sacked on 2 February 2013. Roma will also compete in the Coppa Italia starting in the round of 16. Which they by January reached the semi-finals.

Players

Squad information
Last updated on 19 May 2013
Appearances include league matches only

Transfers

In

Total spending:  €16.75M

Loans in

Total spending:  €12.5M

Out

Total income:  €18M

Net Income:  €1.25M

Loans out

Total income:  €0.7M

Net Income:  €11.8M

Pre-season and friendlies

Competitions

Overall

Last updated: 26 May 2013

Serie A

League table

Results summary

Results by round

Matches

Coppa Italia

Statistics

Appearances and goals

|-
! colspan=10 style="background:#B21B1C; color:#FFD700; text-align:center"| Goalkeepers

|-
! colspan=10 style="background:#B21B1C; color:#FFD700; text-align:center"| Defenders

|-
! colspan=10 style="background:#B21B1C; color:#FFD700; text-align:center"| Midfielders

|-
! colspan=10 style="background:#B21B1C; color:#FFD700; text-align:center"| Forwards

|-
! colspan=10 style="background:#B21B1C; color:#FFD700; text-align:center"| Players transferred out during the season

Goalscorers

Last updated: 26 May 2013

Clean sheets

Last updated: 26 May 2013

Disciplinary record

Last updated: 26 May 2013

References

A.S. Roma seasons
Roma